Pterocalla is a genus of picture-winged flies in the family Ulidiidae.

Species
Pterocalla amazonica
Pterocalla angustipennis
Pterocalla bella
Pterocalla costalis
Pterocalla guttulata
Pterocalla maculata
Pterocalla nitidiventris
Pterocalla oculata
Pterocalla ophthalmoptera
Pterocalla pennata
Pterocalla pentophthalma
Pterocalla plumitarsis
Pterocalla proxima
Pterocalla punctata
Pterocalla quadrata
Pterocalla radiata
Pterocalla reticulata
Pterocalla scutellata
Pterocalla striata
Pterocalla strigula
Pterocalla undulata

References

 
Ulidiidae
Brachycera genera